Job 16 is the sixteenth chapter of the Book of Job in the Hebrew Bible or the Old Testament of the Christian Bible. The book is anonymous; most scholars believe it was written around 6th century BCE. This chapter records the speech of Job, which belongs to the Dialogue section of the book, comprising Job 3:1–31:40.

Text
The original text is written in Hebrew language. This chapter is divided into 22 verses.

Textual witnesses
Some early manuscripts containing the text of this chapter in Hebrew are of the Masoretic Text, which includes the Aleppo Codex (10th century), and Codex Leningradensis (1008).

There is also a translation into Koine Greek known as the Septuagint, made in the last few centuries BC; some extant ancient manuscripts of this version include Codex Vaticanus (B; B; 4th century), Codex Sinaiticus (S; BHK: S; 4th century), and Codex Alexandrinus (A; A; 5th century).

Analysis
The structure of the book is as follows:
The Prologue (chapters 1–2)
The Dialogue (chapters 3–31)
The Verdicts (32:1–42:6)
The Epilogue (42:7–17)

Within the structure, chapter 16 is grouped into the Dialogue section with the following outline:
Job's Self-Curse and Self-Lament (3:1–26)
Round One (4:1–14:22)
Round Two (15:1–21:34)
Eliphaz (15:1–35)
Job (16:1–17:16)
You Are Miserable Comforters (16:1–5)
Lamenting His Lot (16:6–17)
The Possibility of a Heavenly Witness (16:18–22)
A Lack of Hope (17:1–2)
Speaking to God (17:3–5)
Complaining to the Friends (17:6–10)
Job's Present Despair (17:11–16)
Bildad (18:1–21)
Job (19:1–29)
Zophar (20:1–29)
Job (21:1–34)
Round Three (22:1–27:23)
Interlude – A Poem on Wisdom (28:1–28)
Job's Summing Up (29:1–31:40)

The Dialogue section is composed in the format of poetry with distinctive syntax and grammar. 

Chapter 16 consists of three parts:
Job regards his friends as "miserable comforters" (verses 1–5)
Job laments how God is treating him (verses 6–17)
Job considers 'the possibility of a heavenly witness' (verses 18–22)

Job reflects on his friends as miserable comforters (16:1–5)
Job starts his first speech in the second round of the conversation with his friends with a complaint that all of them are miserable comforters, giving him nothing new as he has heard many things like what they said (verse 2a) and he also was able to speak as they did (verse 4a). Job points out that the friends string words together while shaking their head, not in sympathy but in derision, against him (cf. Psalm 22:7; 109:25), instead of saying something useful as he would do if he were in their shoes (verse 5).

Verse 5
[Job said:] "I could strengthen you with my mouth,
and the solace of my lips would assuage your pain."
"Assuage": translated from the Hebrew verb , yakhsokh, meaning "to restrain; to withhold". If their roles were reversed, Job would provide his friends with words of solace in their pain, not accusations that rub salt into the wounds, as they have done thusfar to Job.

Job complains of God's treatment and wishes help from a heavenly witness (16:6–22)
Job states that his pain is not eased by speaking or by not speaking about it, as he firmly believes God is in charge of the world and treats Job as God pleases (verses 12–14). Therefore Job called for help from a heavenly figure, who will argue Job's case with God (verse 21; cf. Job 9:33; 19:25; 31:35).

Verse 20

My friends scorn me,but I pour out my tears to God.Verse 21
[Job said:] "Oh, that one might plead for a man with God,as a man pleads for his neighbor!""As a man pleads": the word "a man" is translated from the Hebrew expression "son of man" (ḇen-’āḏām'').
"Neighbor": or "friend".

See also

Related Bible parts: Job 9, Job 15, Job 31

References

Sources

External links
 Jewish translations:
 Iyov - Job - Chapter 16 (Judaica Press) translation [with Rashi's commentary] at Chabad.org
 Christian translations:
 Online Bible at GospelHall.org (ESV, KJV, Darby, American Standard Version, Bible in Basic English)
 Book of Job Chapter 16. Various versions
  Various versions

16